The Commission communautaire française (COCOF) or the French Community Commission is the local representative of the French-speaking authorities in the Brussels-Capital Region, one of the three regions of Belgium.

On 3 December 2001, the Assemblée de la Commission communautaire française or ACCF (Assembly of the French Community Commission) informally changed its name to Parlement francophone bruxellois (French-speaking Brussels Parliament). The Parliament is currently presided by Christos Doulkeridis.

Unlike the Flemish Community Commission, the French Community Commission has been granted legislative power in some areas (such as tourism and healthcare) by the French Community.

Blazon: Quartered, the I and IV Wallonia, the II and III Brussels-Capital Region.

See also 
 Brussels Parliament
 French Community of Belgium
 Common Community Commission
 Flemish Community Commission (VGC)

External links 
 Official page of the COCOF 
 Official page of the French-speaking Brussels Parliament 

Community Commissions in Belgium
Commission
Politics of Brussels